This is a complete list of episodes of the Lassie television series.  Created by Robert Maxwell, Lassie premiered on CBS on September 12, 1954, where it aired for seventeen seasons, before moving to first run syndication for its final two seasons. The final episode of the series aired on March 24, 1973. Maxwell also acted as the show's producer until 1957, when Jack Wrather purchased the production company and show.  He would be the show's producer for the rest of its run. The series continued to air in rerun syndication (both on broadcast TV and cable), off and on, for another 50 years. In syndication, the episodes in which Lassie was paired with the Miller family were often aired under the name Jeff's Collie, while the years with the Martin family were sometimes aired under the name Timmy & Lassie.

The 591-episode series is generally broken into five parts, based on the ownership of Lassie. The "Miller years" (Jeff's Collie) comprise the first three seasons of the series and part of the fourth, during which Lassie is owned by Jeff Miller (Tommy Rettig).  In the middle of the fourth season, the unexpected death of George Cleveland is mirrored in the show with the unexpected death of his character, "Gramps." The farm is then sold to the Martin family, which also adopts Ellen Miller's foster child, Timmy (Jon Provost), and Jeff gives Lassie to Timmy to help him cope. The "Martin years" (Timmy & Lassie) would run until 1964. 

At the opening of the 11th season, a job transfer sees the Martins moving to Australia and having to leave Lassie behind in the United States. After a brief stay with family friend Cully Wilson, Lassie joins Corey Stuart (Robert Bray), a ranger with the United States Forestry Service. Early in the 15th season, Stuart is badly injured in a forest fire, but Lassie remains with the forest service in the care of rangers Scott Turner (Jed Allan) and Bob Erickson (Jack De Mave).  The "Ranger years" end at the end of the 16th season.  

During the 17th season, the series became somewhat of an anthology, as Lassie is now (with no explanation) on her own without human caretakers, traveling from place to place, helping people and other animals as needed before moving on to her next destination. Season 17 would be the series' last on CBS, which canceled the series in 1971 as part of the "rural purge" (a move to replace what was seen as rural/family based shows with what was deemed to be more urban centered, "socially relevant" programming). During the final two seasons (the "Holden Ranch years"), the show moved to first-run syndication, and Lassie was taken in by the caretakers of the Holden Ranch - a ranch for troubled children - where she settled in for the remainder of the series.

Series overview

Episodes

Miller years

Season 1 (1954–55)

Season 2 (1955–56)

Season 3 (1956–57)

Martin years 
In syndication, these seasons were often retitled to Timmy and Lassie.

Season 4 (1957–58)

Season 5 (1958–59)

Season 6 (1959–60)

Season 7 (1960–61)

Season 8 (1961–62)

Season 9 (1962–63)

Season 10 (1963–64)

Ranger years

Season 11 (1964–65) 
This is the last season to be produced in black-and-white

Season 12 (1965–66) 
All episodes (season 12 and onwards) in color

Season 13 (1966–67)

Season 14 (1967–68)

Season 15 (1968–69)

Season 16 (1969–70)

On her own

Season 17 (1970–71) 
This is the last season to air originally on CBS.

Holden Ranch years

Season 18 (1971–72) 
This is the first season to air in first-run syndication

Season 19 (1972–73)

Notes

References 
 General
 

 Sources

Lists of American drama television series episodes
Lists of American children's television series episodes
Episodes